was a Japanese variety show that ran from April 9, 2005 to October 6, 2007 on Fuji TV. Aired from 13:00 to 13:30 (JST), it was the third variety show on Fuji TV to feature the musical idol group Arashi.

Segments

Being Grandchildren for a Day
 in Japanese. Two members would pair up and visit the home of an elderly couple, who would be their "grandparents" for the day. The two would act as their fill in grandchildren and split up to help or spend time with either the grandfather or grandmother do chores, cook lunch or work. Usually after lunch, there would be a "Love-Love Talk" consisting of stories of the grandparents' love stories such as their first kiss, first date, marriage and impressions of each other. By the end of the day, the grandfather would usually present the grandmother a gift after some urging on the grandchildren's part, and the grandchildren themselves would each present a gift to their grandparents before leaving.

Chinese Lessons
 in Japanese. Arashi and one guest would take lessons in Mandarin from a teacher. With a theme, the members and guest study basic Mandarin within a limited time and demonstrate their abilities through a test. The person who did the poorest would have to review the lesson by himself in the end.

Arashi's Castle Town
 in Japanese. Two members would visit different castles of Japan.

Arashi's Assault: Children's Dinner
 in Japanese. While the parents go out on a date, two members would engage in a cooking battle against each other and have the children judge whose dish tasted better. At the parents' request, the theme of the dinner would usually be something the children dislikes eating such as cooked bell peppers or eggplants. The loser of the battle would have to clean up the kitchen by himself and, when the parents return, the members would present them a menu of what their children had for dinner with a short message from each member below the photo of their respective dish.

Arashi's Edo Life Exploration
 in Japanese. A pair of Arashi members and another pair of guests would take a map of Edo and compete against each other to find different locations of Edo in modern-day Tokyo.

Specials

Mago Mago Boating Club
A special that followed the group's three-month progress of learning rowing without any prior experience in order to fulfill the wish of a "grandfather" from one of their Being Grandchildren for a Day segments and training for an official rowing competition.

Episode guide

Staff
Producer: 
Organizer: 
Narrators: ,

References

Japanese variety television shows
Fuji TV original programming
2005 Japanese television series debuts
2007 Japanese television series endings